Hjördis Levin (born 4 June 1930) is a Swedish historian and author whose field of research focuses on gender studies.

Early years and education
Hildur (nickname, "Hjördis") Charlotta Eriksson was born in Smedby, Östergötland County on 4 June 1930. Levin is the daughter of the gardener Karl Erik Karlsson and Hildur Schwarz. she studied office education at an early age and was an office employee until 1968. She received a B.A. degree in 1971, and earned a doctoral degree at Umeå University in 1994.

Career
She was a course leader in speech and argumentation techniques in Stockholm from 1973, and worked as a speech trainer in her own company, Juno Speech Training, from 1986.

Levin has been an active freelance writer. She has worked as an employee of the Swedish Women's Left Federation's magazine Vi Mänskor from 1969. She has also written articles for, among other things, Kvinnobulletinen and Acca and has been active as a lecturer. She was an employee of Focus in the 1980s and wrote biographical articles on women for Svenskt biografiskt lexikon.

Levin has been active since the 1970s in the Swedish Women's Left Federation and Group 8. She has also been a municipal political activist for the Left Party in Stockholm Municipality as a member of the social district committee in Social District 9 (southern Farsta). She is a member of the Swedish Writers' Association since 1988, and member of the Swedish Women's Left Federation's National Board.

Levin's 1994 thesis deals with the sexual debate in 1880–1910 and how it led to the so-called Preventive Law in 1910, which prohibited the dissemination of use or knowledge of contraception among the public. Levin has since continued to survey and describe the subsequent period 1923–1936 with a women's struggle for sexual equality and gender equality, and which led, among other things, to the abolition of the Prevention Act 1938.

Her husband was Jonny Levin (1926-1955).

Selected works
Blå safir (dikter, 1965)
Testiklarnas herravälde: Sexualmoralens historia (1986, utökad upplaga 1989)
Elisabeth Tamm på Fogelstad: en radikal herrgårdsfröken (1989)
Masken uti rosen: nymalthusianism och födelsekontroll i Sverige 1880–1910 (doktorsavhandling, 1994)
Kvinnorna på barrikaden: sexualpolitik och sociala frågor 1923–36 (1997)
En radikal herrgårdsfröken: Elisabeth Tamm på Fogelstad – liv och verk (2003)
Kampen mot "vita slavhandeln" : trafficking i historiskt perspektiv (2015)
Flickebarnet i sävlådan: en tragisk historia från det fattiga Sverige (2017)

References

Citations

Bibliography
Levin, H Hjördis C in Who is she: women in Sweden: biographical reference book (1988), 

1930 births
Living people
People from Östergötland County
Swedish women historians
20th-century Swedish historians
20th-century Swedish women writers
Gender studies academics
Left Party (Sweden)
Umeå University alumni